Horningtops is a hamlet south-southeast of Liskeard in east Cornwall, England in National Grid grid square SX2760. It is in the civil parish of St Keyne and Trewidland.

References

Hamlets in Cornwall